This list of fossil arthropods described in 2019 is a list of new taxa of trilobites, fossil insects, crustaceans, arachnids and other fossil arthropods of every kind that are scheduled to be described during the year 2019, as well as other significant discoveries and events related to arthropod paleontology that are scheduled to occur in the year 2019.

General research
 A revision of higher-level arthropod taxonomy is published by Aria (2019), who proposes the name Cenocondyla for the least inclusive group containing both Mandibulata and Chelicerata.
 A study on the molecular composition and microanatomy of the eyes of 54-million-year-old crane flies from the Fur Formation (Denmark), evaluating its implications for the knowledge of optical systems of other ancient arthropods (especially trilobites), is published by Lindgren et al. (2019).

Arachnids

Research
 Two new specimens of laniatorid harvestmen (an adult specimen assignable to the species Proholoscotolemon nemastomoides and a smaller specimen belonging or related to the genus Proholoscotolemon) are described from the Eocene Baltic amber by Bartel & Dunlop (2019).
 A review of the phylogenetic hypotheses of scorpion interrelationships, as well as of scorpion palaeontology, is published by Howard et al. (2019), who also provide a list of scorpion fossil calibrations for use in molecular dating.
 A fossil spider, possibly a juvenile female golden silk orb-weaver, is described from the Lower Eocene Palana Formation of the Gurha opencast lignite mine (western Rajasthan, India) by Patel, Rana & Selden (2019), representing the first fossil spider from India which wasn't found in amber.
 A review of the fossil record and evolutionary history of spiders, reevaluating the phylogenetic placement of key fossils and aiming to determine whether there has been a major turnover in the spider fauna between the Mesozoic and Cenozoic, is published online by Magalhaes et al. (2019).

New taxa

Crustaceans

Research
 A global dataset of exceptionally preserved muscles and muscle attachment scars in fossil malacostracan specimens is compiled by Klompmaker et al. (2019).
 A three-dimensionally preserved tanaidacean specimen belonging or related to the species Jurapseudes friedericianus is described from the Middle Jurassic (Callovian) Ornatenton Formation (Germany) by Schädel et al. (2019).
 A study on the evolutionary history of decapod crustaceans is published by Wolfe et al. (2019).
 A study on the chemical composition of two specimens of fossilized shrimps from the Cretaceous Romualdo and Ipubi formations (Araripe Basin, Brazil), and on its implications for inferring the course of the processes of fossilization of these crustaceans, is published by Barros et al. (2019).
 A study on the Middle Jurassic palaeoenvironment of La Voulte (France), as indicated by data from exceptionally preserved eyes of the polychelidan lobster Voulteryon parvulus and from epibiontic brachiopods associated with V. parvulus, is published by Audo et al. (2019).
 A study on the anatomy of the holotype specimen of a putative Paleocene shark Platyacrodus unicus is published by Bogan, Agnolin & Ezcurra (2019), who reinterpret this specimen as a carapace of a small retroplumid crab belonging to the genus Costacopluma.
 An achelatan larval fossil with an intermediate type of morphology, interpreted as the oldest occurrence of an achelatan lobster larva reported so far, is described from the Toarcian Posidonia Shale (Germany) by Haug, Haug & Schweigert (2019).
 Redescription of the isopod species Palaega sismondai Ristori (1891) is published by Hyžný, Pasini & Garassino (2019), who transfer this species to the genus Bathynomus.
 A moult of a giant isopod is described from the early Oligocene Ranzano Formation by Pasini & Garassino (2019), representing the oldest fossil record of the genus Bathynomus from Italy.
 A study on the Late Devonian ostracods from the Yangdi and Nandong sections in South China, and on their responses to the Frasnian-Famennian event, is published by Song, Huang & Gong (2019).
 A diverse earliest Triassic ostracod fauna is reported from the Yangou section in South China by Qiu et al. (2019).
 A revision of ostracods from the Upper Oligocene to Lower Miocene Pirabas Formation (Brazil) is published by Nogueira, Ramos & Hunt (2019).
 A study on changes of diversity of Neogene fossil marine ostracods from Java, Indonesia is published by Shin et al. (2019).
 A study on deep-sea benthic ostracod assemblages from the southern Sea of Japan covering the last 2 million years, evaluating their responses to the Mid-Brunhes Event, orbital-scale climatic cycles, and fluctuations of the Tsushima Warm Current, is published by Huang et al. (2019).
 A three-dimensionally preserved specimen of a late growth stage of the phosphatocopid species Cyclotron angelini is described from the Furongian strata of northern Poland by Olempska et al. (2019).
 A study on the ecology of clam shrimps from the Anjiagou and Hengdaozi beds of the Lower Cretaceous Yixian Formation (China) is published by Hethke et al. (2019).
 A study on the oxygen isotope composition of whale barnacle shells from three Pleistocene localities along the eastern Pacific coast, and on their implications for the knowledge of the history of whale migrations, is published by Taylor et al. (2019).
 A study on the internal soft-tissue anatomy of Hesslandona angustata is published by Liu et al. (2019).

New taxa

Malacostracans

Ostracods
{| class="wikitable sortable" align="center" width="100%"
|-
! Name
! Novelty
! Status
! Authors
! Age
! Type locality
! Country
! Notes
! Images
|-
|
Amicytheridea bilthanaensis
|
Sp. nov
|
Valid
|
Chaudhary & Nagori
|
Late Cretaceous
|
Bagh Formation
|

|
|
|-
|
Bairdiocypris fabiformis
|
Sp. nov
|
Valid
|
Melnikova
|
Late Ordovician
|
Delingde Formation
|

|
|
|-
|
Bairdoppilata dorsoarcuata
|
Sp. nov
|
Valid
|
Nogueira, Ramos & Hunt
|
Late Oligocene to early Miocene
|
Pirabas Formation
|

|
A member of Podocopida belonging to the family Bairdiidae.
|
|-
|
Bairdoppilata pintoi
|
Sp. nov
|
Valid
|
Nogueira, Ramos & Hunt
|
Late Oligocene to early Miocene
|
La Rosa Formation
Pirabas Formation
|

|
A member of Podocopida belonging to the family Bairdiidae.
|
|-
|
Bairdoppilata turonica
|
Sp. nov
|
Valid
|
Slipper
|
Late Cretaceous (Turonian)
|
|

|
|
|-
|
Bairdoppilata vandenboldi
|
Sp. nov
|
Valid
|
Nogueira, Ramos & Hunt
|
Late Oligocene to early Miocene
|
Pirabas Formation
|

|
A member of Podocopida belonging to the family Bairdiidae.
|
|-
|
Bakunella anae
|
Sp. nov
|
Valid
|
Spadi et al.
|
Late Miocene–Pliocene
|
|

|
A member of the family Candonidae.
|
|-
|
Bassleratia torquata
|
Sp. nov
|
Valid
|
Melnikova
|
Late Ordovician
|
Delingde Formation
|

|
|
|-
|
Bolbozoe psittaca
|
Sp. nov
|
Valid
|
Perrier et al.
|
Silurian
|
|

|
A member of Myodocopa.
|
|-
|
Boreobolbina morkokiana
|
Sp. nov
|
Valid
|
Melnikova
|
Late Ordovician
|
Delingde Formation
|

|
|
|-
|
Bradleya majorani
|
Sp. nov
|
Valid
|
Bergue, Brandão & Anjos Zerfass
|
Pleistocene
|
|
Atlantic Ocean (Rio Grande Rise)
|
A member of the family Thaerocytheridae.
|
|-
|
Bradleya ybate
|
Sp. nov
|
Valid
|
Bergue, Brandão & Anjos Zerfass
|
Late Miocene
|
|
Atlantic Ocean (Rio Grande Rise)
|
A member of the family Thaerocytheridae.
|
|-
|
Bythocypris wangi
|
Sp. nov
|
Valid
|
Tanaka, Siveter & Williams
|
Devonian
|
Fukuji Formation
|

|
|
|-
|
Bythoceratina? asulcata
|
Sp. nov
|
Valid
|
Nogueira, Ramos & Hunt
|
Early Miocene
|
Pirabas Formation
|

|
A member of Podocopida belonging to the family Bythocytheridae.
|
|-
|
Bythoceratina? sinuocostata
|
Sp. nov
|
Valid
|
Nogueira, Ramos & Hunt
|
Late Oligocene to early Miocene
|
Pirabas Formation
|

|
A member of Podocopida belonging to the family Bythocytheridae.
|
|-
|
Cardobairdia longitecta
|
Sp. nov
|
Valid
|
Slipper
|
Late Cretaceous (Turonian)
|
|

|
|
|-
|
Carinobairdia cabralae
|
Sp. nov
|
|
Forel in Forel, Thuy & Wisshak
|
Late Triassic (Carnian)
|
Maantang Formation
|

|
A member of the family Bairdiidae.
|
|-
|
Cativella primaveraensis
|
Sp. nov
|
Valid
|
Nogueira, Ramos & Hunt
|
Early Miocene
|
Pirabas Formation
|

|
A member of Podocopida belonging to the family Trachyleberididae.
|
|-
|
Clavofabellina fukujiensis
|
Sp. nov
|
Valid
|
Tanaka, Siveter & Williams
|
Devonian
|
Fukuji Formation
|

|
|
|-
|
Clintiella antifrigga
|
Sp. nov
|
Valid
|
Siveter et al.
|
Silurian
|
Hitoegane Formation
|

|
A beyrichioid palaeocopid ostracod.
|
|-
|
Coelochilina reticulata
|
Sp. nov
|
Valid
|
Melnikova
|
Late Ordovician
|
Delingde Formation
|

|
|
|-
|
Costa spinaventralis
|
Sp. nov
|
Valid
|
Nogueira, Ramos & Hunt
|
Early Miocene
|
Pirabas Formation
|

|
A member of Podocopida belonging to the family Trachyleberididae.
|
|-
|
Curfsina coarctata
|
Sp. nov
|
Valid
|
Chaudhary & Nagori
|
Late Cretaceous
|
Bagh Formation
|

|
|
|-
|
Curfsina hanumanpuraensis
|
Sp. nov
|
Valid
|
Chaudhary & Nagori
|
Late Cretaceous
|
Bagh Formation
|

|
|
|-
|
Cushmanidea? bragantinaensis
|
Sp. nov
|
Valid
|
Nogueira, Ramos & Hunt
|
Late Oligocene to early Miocene
|
Pirabas Formation
|

|
A member of Podocopida belonging to the family Cushmanideidae.
|
|-
|
Cyprideis? carmoi
|
Sp. nov
|
Valid
|
Nogueira, Ramos & Hunt
|
Late Oligocene to early Miocene
|
Pirabas Formation
|

|
A member of Podocopida belonging to the family Cytherideidae.
|
|-
|
Cytherella altacaelateralis
|
Sp. nov
|
Valid
|
Nogueira, Ramos & Hunt
|
Late Oligocene to early Miocene
|
Pirabas Formation
|

|
A member of the family Cytherellidae.
|
|-
|
Cytherella kempfi
|
Sp. nov
|
Valid
|
Nogueira, Ramos & Hunt
|
Late Oligocene to early Miocene
|
Pirabas Formation
|

|
A member of the family Cytherellidae.
|
|-
|
Cytherella notossinuosa
|
Sp. nov
|
Valid
|
Nogueira, Ramos & Hunt
|
Late Oligocene to early Miocene
|
Pirabas Formation
|

|
A member of the family Cytherellidae.
|
|-
|
Cytherella truncatoides
|
Sp. nov
|
Valid
|
Slipper
|
Late Cretaceous (Turonian)
|
|

|
|
|-
|
Cytherella vulna
|
Sp. nov
|
Valid
|
Slipper
|
Late Cretaceous (Turonian)
|
|

|
|
|-
|
Cytherella weaveri
|
Sp. nov
|
Valid
|
Slipper
|
Late Cretaceous (Turonian)
|
|

|
|
|-
|
Cytherelloidea colini
|
Sp. nov
|
Valid
|
Nogueira, Ramos & Hunt
|
Early Miocene
|
Pirabas Formation
|

|
A member of the family Cytherellidae.
|
|-
|
Cytherelloidea cumpassorobusta
|
Sp. nov
|
Valid
|
Nogueira, Ramos & Hunt
|
Early Miocene
|
Pirabas Formation
|

|
A member of the family Cytherellidae.
|
|-
|
Cytherelloidea granulosa parca
|
Subsp. nov
|
Valid
|
Slipper
|
Late Cretaceous (Turonian)
|
|

|
|
|-
|
Cytherelloidea mediocythara
|
Sp. nov
|
Valid
|
Nogueira, Ramos & Hunt
|
Early Miocene
|
Pirabas Formation
|

|
A member of the family Cytherellidae.
|
|-
|
Cytherelloidea quasilenisa
|
Sp. nov
|
Valid
|
Nogueira, Ramos & Hunt
|
Early Miocene
|
Pirabas Formation
|

|
A member of the family Cytherellidae.
|
|-
|
Cytheretta fortiscostata
|
Sp. nov
|
Valid
|
Nogueira, Ramos & Hunt
|
Early Miocene
|
Pirabas Formation
|

|
A member of Podocopida belonging to the family Cytherettidae.
|
|-
|
Cytheretta petrii
|
Sp. nov
|
Valid
|
Nogueira, Ramos & Hunt
|
Early Miocene
|
Pirabas Formation
|

|
A member of Podocopida belonging to the family Cytherettidae.
|
|-
|
Cytheropteron hanumanpuraensis
|
Sp. nov
|
Valid
|
Chaudhary & Nagori
|
Late Cretaceous
|
Bagh Formation
|

|
|
|-
|
Cytheropteron ratitalaiensis
|
Sp. nov
|
Valid
|
Chaudhary & Nagori
|
Late Cretaceous
|
Bagh Formation
|

|
|
|-
|
Cytherura? ornatareticulum
|
Sp. nov
|
Valid
|
Nogueira, Ramos & Hunt
|
Early Miocene
|
Pirabas Formation
|

|
A member of Podocopida belonging to the family Cytheruridae.
|
|-
|
Cytherura? punctocentrata
|
Sp. nov
|
Valid
|
Nogueira, Ramos & Hunt
|
Early Miocene
|
Pirabas Formation
|

|
A member of Podocopida belonging to the family Cytheruridae.
|
|-
|
Cytherura? quasilenisa
|
Sp. nov
|
Valid
|
Nogueira, Ramos & Hunt
|
Late Oligocene to early Miocene
|
Pirabas Formation
|

|
A member of Podocopida belonging to the family Cytheruridae.
|
|-
|
Eocytheropteron bilthanaensis
|
Sp. nov
|
Valid
|
Chaudhary & Nagori
|
Late Cretaceous
|
Bagh Formation
|

|
|
|-
|
Gibbosocythere
|
Gen. et 2 sp. nov
|
Valid
|
Karpuk, Whatley & Maybury
|
Early Cretaceous
|
|
Crimean Peninsula
|
A member of Paradoxostomatidae. Genus includes new species G. ferelevis and G. cellulata.
|
|-
|
Hemicytherura bradyisimilis
|
Sp. nov
|
Valid
|
Nogueira, Ramos & Hunt
|
Early Miocene
|
Pirabas Formation
|

|
A member of Podocopida belonging to the family Cytheruridae.
|
|-
|
Hiatobairdia senegasi
|
Sp. nov
|
|
Forel in Forel, Thuy & Wisshak
|
Late Triassic  (Carnian and Norian)
|
Kuahongdong FormationMaantang Formation
|

|
A member of the family Bairdiidae.
|
|-
|
Hiatobairdia zhengshuyingi
|
Sp. nov
|
|
Forel in Forel, Thuy & Wisshak
|
Late Triassic (Carnian and Norian)
|
Kuahongdong FormationMaantang Formation
|

|
A member of the family Bairdiidae.
|
|-
|
Hollinella orienta
|
Sp. nov
|
Valid
|
Siveter et al.
|
Silurian
|
Gionyama Formation
|

|
A hollinoid palaeocopid ostracod.
|
|-
|
Hulingsina? lorenesmithae
|
Sp. nov
|
Valid
|
Nogueira, Ramos & Hunt
|
Early Miocene
|
Pirabas Formation
|

|
A member of Podocopida belonging to the family Cushmanideidae.
|
|-
|
Hulingsina reticulorugosa
|
Sp. nov
|
Valid
|
Nogueira, Ramos & Hunt
|
Late Oligocene to early Miocene
|
Pirabas Formation
|

|
A member of Podocopida belonging to the family Cushmanideidae.
|
|-
|
Hungarella gommerii
|
Sp. nov
|
|
Forel in Forel, Thuy & Wisshak
|
Late Triassic (Carnian)
|
Maantang Formation
|

|
A member of the family Healdiidae.
|
|-
|
Jatella ampla
|
Sp. nov
|
Valid
|
Melnikova
|
Late Ordovician
|
Delingde Formation
|

|
|
|-
|
Krithe araucoensis
|
Sp. nov
|
Valid
|
Bergue, Coimbra & Finger
|
Early Miocene
|
|

|
|
|-
|
Krithe dawnpetersonae
|
Sp. nov
|
Valid
|
Bergue, Coimbra & Finger
|
Early Miocene
|
|

|
|
|-
|
Krithe nerudai
|
Sp. nov
|
Valid
|
Bergue, Coimbra & Finger
|
Early Miocene
|
|

|
|
|-
|
Leperditella paula
|
Sp. nov
|
Valid
|
Melnikova
|
Late Ordovician
|
Delingde Formation
|

|
|
|-
|
Loxoconcha corpulenta
|
Sp. nov
|
Valid
|
Nogueira, Ramos & Hunt
|
Early Miocene
|
Pirabas Formation
|

|
A member of Podocopida belonging to the family Loxoconchidae.
|
|-
|
Microcythere acuminata
|
Sp. nov
|
Valid
|
Bergue, Brandão & Anjos Zerfass
|
Quaternary
|
|
Atlantic Ocean (Rio Grande Rise)
|
A member of the family Microcytheridae.
|
|-
|
Moierina grata
|
Sp. nov
|
Valid
|
Melnikova
|
Late Ordovician
|
Delingde Formation
|

|
|
|-
|
Mydionobairdia cauladelicata
|
Sp. nov
|
Valid
|
Nogueira, Ramos & Hunt
|
Early Miocene
|
Pirabas Formation
|

|
A member of Podocopida belonging to the family Bairdiidae.
|
|-
|
Nigeroloxoconcha baghensis
|
Sp. nov
|
Valid
|
Chaudhary & Nagori
|
Late Cretaceous
|
Bagh Formation
|

|
|
|-
|
Nigeroloxoconcha diluta
|
Sp. nov
|
Valid
|
Chaudhary & Nagori
|
Late Cretaceous
|
Bagh Formation
|

|
|
|-
|
Nudator
|
Gen. et 4 sp. nov
|
Valid
|
Perrier et al.
|
Silurian (Wenlock and Ludlow)
|
|

?
|
A member of Myodocopa belonging to the family Entomozoidae. The type species is N. inflatus; genus also includes new species N. angiportatus, N. artumatus and N. elegantulus.
|
|-
|
Ochesaarina aculeata
|
Sp. nov
|
Valid
|
Melnikova
|
Late Ordovician
|
Delingde Formation
|

|
|
|-
|
Oculparva
|
Gen. et sp. nov
|
Valid
|
Perrier et al.
|
Silurian
|
|

|
A member of Myodocopa. Genus includes new species O. moncola.
|
|-
|
Ovocytheridea baghensis
|
Sp. nov
|
Valid
|
Chaudhary & Nagori
|
Late Cretaceous
|
Bagh Formation
|

|
|
|-
|
Paijenborchella jeerabadensis
|
Sp. nov
|
Valid
|
Chaudhary & Nagori
|
Late Cretaceous
|
Bagh Formation
|

|
|
|-
|
Pauproles
|
Gen. et sp. nov
|
Valid
|
Siveter et al.
|
Silurian
|
Hitoegane Formation
|

|
A eurychilinoid palaeocopid ostracod. Genus includes new species P. supparata.
|
|-
|
Piscarista
|
Gen. et sp. nov
|
Valid
|
Perrier et al.
|
Silurian
|
|

|
A member of Myodocopa. Genus includes new species P. sagenata.
|
|-
|
Planiglandites
|
Gen. et sp. nov
|
Valid
|
Melnikova
|
Late Ordovician
|
Delingde Formation
|

|
Genus includes new species P. mirabilis'.
|
|-
|Pontocyprella goussardi|
Sp. nov
|
|
Forel in Forel, Thuy & Wisshak
|
Late Triassic (Carnian)
|
Maantang Formation
|

|
A member of the family Pontocyprididae.
|
|-
|Pontocyprella robusta cometa|
Subsp. nov
|
Valid
|
Slipper
|
Late Cretaceous (Turonian)
|
|

|
|
|-
|Pontocypris aguilerai|
Sp. nov
|
Valid
|
Nogueira, Ramos & Hunt
|
Late Oligocene to early Miocene
|
Pirabas Formation
|

|
A member of Podocopida belonging to the family Pontocypridae.
|
|-
|Pseudotethysia|
Gen. et sp. nov
|
Valid
|
Karpuk, Whatley & Maybury
|
Early Cretaceous
|
|
Crimean Peninsula
|
A member of Cytheruridae. Genus includes new species P. reticulata.
|
|-
|Quadracythere adornata|
Sp. nov
|
Valid
|
Nogueira, Ramos & Hunt
|
Early Miocene
|
Pirabas Formation
|

|
A member of Podocopida belonging to the family Hemicytheridae.
|
|-
|Quadracythere fortisrobusta|
Sp. nov
|
Valid
|
Nogueira, Ramos & Hunt
|
Early Miocene
|
Pirabas Formation
|

|
A member of Podocopida belonging to the family Hemicytheridae.
|
|-
|Quadracythere limbimodesta|
Sp. nov
|
Valid
|
Nogueira, Ramos & Hunt
|
Early Miocene
|
Pirabas Formation
|

|
A member of Podocopida belonging to the family Hemicytheridae.
|
|-
|Rectella cistelliformis|
Sp. nov
|
Valid
|
Melnikova
|
Late Ordovician
|
Delingde Formation
|

|
|
|-
|Retiprimites alveolatus|
Sp. nov
|
Valid
|
Melnikova
|
Late Ordovician
|
Delingde Formation
|

|
|
|-
|Retiprimites mirandus|
Sp. nov
|
Valid
|
Melnikova
|
Late Ordovician
|
Delingde Formation
|

|
|
|-
|Rostrocytheridea decurtata|
Sp. nov
|
Valid
|
Chaudhary, Nagori & Khosla
|
Late Cretaceous
|
Bagh Formation
|

|
A member of the family Cytherideidae.
|
|-
|Rostrocytheridea divergens|
Sp. nov
|
Valid
|
Chaudhary, Nagori & Khosla
|
Late Cretaceous
|
Bagh Formation
|

|
A member of the family Cytherideidae.
|
|-
|Semicytherura? fortisreticulata|
Sp. nov
|
Valid
|
Nogueira, Ramos & Hunt
|
Early Miocene
|
Pirabas Formation
|

|
A member of Podocopida belonging to the family Cytheruridae.
|
|-
|Seminova|
Gen. et comb. nov
|
Valid
|
Perrier et al.|
Silurian
|
|

|
A member of Myodocopa belonging to the superfamily Bolbozoidea. The type species is "Entomis" depressa Jones (1884).
|
|-
|Tenedocythere? rugosocostata|
Sp. nov
|
Valid
|
Nogueira, Ramos & Hunt
|
Early Miocene
|
Pirabas Formation
|

|
A member of Podocopida belonging to the family Hemicytheridae.
|
|-
|Touroconcha ishizakii|
Sp. nov
|
Valid
|
Nogueira, Ramos & Hunt
|
Early Miocene
|
Pirabas Formation
|

|
A member of Podocopida belonging to the family Loxoconchidae.
|
|-
|Uthoernia sibirica|
Sp. nov
|
Valid
|
Melnikova
|
Late Ordovician
|
Delingde Formation
|

|
|
|-
|}

Other crustaceans

Insects

Trilobites

Research
 A study on the rates of evolution of trilobites in the Cambrian is published by Paterson, Edgecombe & Lee (2019), who interpret their findings as indicative of Cambrian rather than Precambrian origin of trilobites, and as indicating that the Cambrian explosion had already largely concluded by the time the typical Cambrian fossil record begins (≈521 Ma).
 A study on repaired injuries in trilobite specimens from the Cambrian Ruin Wash Lagerstätte (Nevada, United States) is published by Pates & Bicknell (2019), who interpret their findings as indicative of species specific predation on Cambrian trilobites, and of enlarged spines in some trilobite species serving as possible predation deterrents.
 A study on the morphology and ontogeny of Changaspis elongata, based on data from specimens from the Lazizhai section of the Balang Formation (Cambrian Stage 4; Guizhou, China), is published by Du et al. (2019).
 A cluster of over a 100 juvenile trilobites belonging to the genus Aphelaspis is reported from the Cambrian (Paibian) Conasauga Formation (Georgia, United States) by Schwimmer & Montante (2019).
 A study on patterns of occupancy and diversity trajectories in late Cambrian-early Ordovician trilobite communities from the Argentine Cordillera Oriental is published by Serra, Balseiro & Waisfeld (2019).
 A study on the phylogenetic relationships of members of the family Olenidae is published by Monti & Confalonieri (2019).
 A study on the phylogenetic relationships of members of the olenid subfamily Balnibarbiinae is published by Hopkins (2019).
 Nine specimens of Symphysurus ebbestadi preserving all key stages of the exoskeleton moulting process are described from the Lower Ordovician Fezouata Formation (Morocco) by Drage et al. (2019).
 A study on clusters of Ampyx priscus from the Ordovician Fezouata Shale of Morocco is published by Vannier et al. (2019), who interpret these clusters as evidence of a collective behaviour rather than a result of passive transportation and accumulation.
 A study on the phylogenetic relationships of the species and subspecies assigned to the phacopid genus Austerops is published by Oudot et al. (2019).
 A study on the morphological changes in the ontogeny of the Ordovician phacopid trilobite Calyptaulax strasburgensis is published by Jacobs & Carlucci (2019).
 A well-preserved body cluster of 18 specimens of Arctinurus boltoni is described from the Silurian Rochester Shale (New York, United States) by Bicknell, Paterson & Hopkins (2019).
 A study on development and evolution of the cephalon and the pygidium in phacopid trilobites is published by Oudot et al. (2019).
 A study on the internal structures of eyes of trilobites belonging to the genera Asaphus and Archegonus is published by Scholtz, Staude & Dunlop (2019); the study is subsequently criticized by Schoenemann & Clarkson (2021).
 A study on the variability of trilobite moulting behaviour is published by Drage (2019).

New taxa

Other arthropods

Research
 A study on the morphology of appendages of the euarthropod Ercaicunia multinodosa from the Early Cambrian Chengjiang biota (China) is published by Zhai et al. (2019).
 Description of the appendicular morphology of Sinoburius lunaris is published by Chen et al. (2019).
 Description of a new specimen of Emeraldella brutoni from the Cambrian Wheeler Formation (Drum Mountains, Utah, United States), providing new information on the appendicular anatomy of this species, is published by Lerosey-Aubril & Ortega-Hernández (2019).
 Description of new bradoriid fossils from the Chengjiang biota, revealing hitherto unknown morphological differences in limb anatomy between bradoriid species, is published by Zhai et al. (2019), who evaluate the implications of this finding for the knowledge of the phylogenetic relationships of bradoriids.
 A study on the appendage structure of Naraoia spinosa at both juvenile and adult stages is published by Zhai et al. (2019).
 Description of exceptionally preserved soft tissues from mature individuals of Peronopsis and Ptychagnostus from the Cambrian Burgess Shale (British Columbia, Canada), and a study on their implications for inferring the phylogenetic placement of agnostinids within Arthropoda, is published by Moysiuk & Caron (2019).
 Completely enrolled, phosphatized specimens of Tsunyidiscus yanjiazhaiensis are described from Cambrian Stage 3 of South China by Dai et al. (2019).
 The ontogenetic series of Pagetia vinusta is documented from the Cambrian (Wuliuan) Kaili Formation (Guizhou, China) by Cui et al. (2019).
 A study reevaluating crystals of a copper sulfide mineral found in association with specimens of Marrella splendens from the Burgess Shale, originally interpreted as evidence that the animal's blood contained the Cu-bearing protein hemocyanin, is published by Gaines et al. (2019).
 A study on the anatomy of the nervous system of Alalcomenaeus is published by Ortega-Hernández, Lerosey-Aubril & Pates (2019).
 Juvenile specimens of stylonurine eurypterids belonging to the family Hardieopteridae are described from the Famennian locality of Strud (Belgium) by Lamsdell et al. (2019), who interpret their findings as evidence indicating that eurypterids underwent a marine to freshwater transition during the Devonian, and that juvenile eurypterids inhabited sheltered nursery pools (and migrated to rivers upon reaching maturity).
 A study on the structure of the eyes of eurypterids is published by Schoenemann, Poschmann & Clarkson (2019).
 A study on ontogenetic changes in prosomal morphology in Carboniferous horseshoe crab Euproops danae is published by Tashman, Feldmann & Schweitzer (2019).
 A study on the anatomy of the appendages of the Cretaceous xiphosurid Tachypleus syriacus and on the evolution of fossil horseshoe crab appendages is published by Bicknell et al. (2019).
 A study re-evaluating the fossil evidence for lateral compound eyes in Paleozoic horseshoe crabs is published by Bicknell, Amati & Ortega-Hernández (2019).
 A study on the morphology of the millipede Phryssonotus burmiticus'' from the Cretaceous amber from Myanmar is published by Su, Cai & Huang (2019).

New taxa

References

2019 in paleontology